Aga Aga Sunbai Kay Mhanta Sasubai? is an Indian Marathi language comedy show. It starred Sukanya Kulkarni and Swanandi Tikekar in lead roles. It is produced by Manjiri Bhave under the banner of Kanha's Magic. The show premiered from 21 December 2022 airing Wednesday to Saturday on Zee Marathi.

Plot 
It is the story of relationship between daughter-in-law and mother-in-law where their husbands get irritated due to their quarreling nature. The show revolves around sweet and sour bond between the Mantri family.

Special episode (1 hour) 
 29 January 2023
 19 February 2023

Cast 
 Sukanya Kulkarni as Sarita Madhav Mantri
 Swanandi Tikekar as Ankita Shantanu Mantri
 Sanchit Chaudhari as Shantanu Madhav Mantri (Pilu)
 Milind Phatak as Madhav Mantri
 Ronak Shinde as Raunak Madhav Mantri
 Mrudula Kulkarni as Madhushree
 Rama Nadgauda as Sulu Aaji

References

External links 
 Aga Aga Sunbai Kay Mhanta Sasubai? at ZEE5

Marathi-language television shows
2022 Indian television series debuts
Zee Marathi original programming